Professor Anura Rambukkana is head of the Anura Rambukkana Research Group at the University of Edinburgh's Centre for Regenerative Medicine. He is a specialist in research into the causes of leprosy.

Selected publications

References

External links 

Living people
Rockefeller University faculty
Academics of the University of Edinburgh
Leprologists
Year of birth missing (living people)